Shelley Curtis is an American television soap opera director and producer. She has been working in daytime since 1979. She's sometimes credited as Shelly Curtis.

Positions held
All My Children
 Occasional Director (2003–2007, 2010–2011)

Days of Our Lives
 Supervising Producer (1988–1989, 1989–1992)
 Supervising Executive Producer (1989)
 Producer (1983–1988)
 Director (1983–1988)

General Hospital
 Director (1992–2001, 2002)
 Consulting Producer (1994–2001)
 Producer (1992–1994)
 Associate Director (1979–1982)

Guiding Light
 Occasional Director (2002–2007)

Loving
 Occasional Director (1994–1995)

One Life to Live
 Occasional Director (1997–2001)

Port Charles
 Occasional Director (1997–1999, 2002)
 Consulting Producer (1997–1999)

Monarch Cove
 Executive Producer (2006)

Awards and nominations
Daytime Emmy Award
Nomination, 1995–2001, Drama Series, General Hospital
Nomination, 1995–2001, Best Directing, General Hospital
Win, 1995–2000, Drama Series, General Hospital
Win, 2000, Directing, General Hospital

Directors Guild of America Award
Nomination, 1996, Directing, General Hospital

Other
Curtis is largely credited with inventing the word juj in 1984. Defined as adding style to a person, outfit or cinematic set. The word was adopted by Queer Eye for the Straight Guy and has since become common parlance in and out of Hollywood.

External links

American television directors
American television producers
American women television producers
American women television directors
Living people
Soap opera producers
Year of birth missing (living people)
21st-century American women